Manushullo Devudu is a 1974 Indian Telugu-language drama film, produced by A. Pundarikakshaiah under the Sri Bhaskara Chitra banner and directed by B. V. Prasad. It stars N. T. Rama Rao and Vanisri, with music composed by T. V. Raju as his last composition. He expired during the shoot and S. Hanumantha Rao completed the music. The film was remade in Hindi as Udhar Ka Sindur (1976).

Plot 
The film begins with an altruistic Dr. Ranganatham detecting an orphan Raja / Raja Shekaram that toils for his education and also split from his sibling Seeta. So, he adopts him, which is unwelcome by his wife Janaki & son Murali. Years roll by, and Raja is meritorious whereas Murali is turpitude and the two proceeds to higher education. Here, Raja crushes a beauty, Rekha. Besides, Seeta is reared under the last love of rickshaw driver Govindu as an elder. Later, Ranganatham fixes an alliance for his daughter Sudha with Chanti Babu the son of stingy Garudachalam by bestowing  dowry. Forthwith, he is bankrupted by the lavish expenses of Murali and also paralyzes. Next, Raja & Murali back when Janki accuses Murali and he quits. Plus, Sudha’s espousal is called off when Raja sureties Garudachalam to equip the amount.

Fortuitously, he discerns a match with a blind girl Shanta the daughter of tycoon Ramadasu who is ready to bestow . Therein, Raja bedecks to it receives the prerequisite divulging the pathetic spot when Shanta reads his integrity. Now Raja delivers it to Garudachalam of which Ranganatham is unbeknownst and performs the nuptial. Following, Raja knits Shanta by forgoing his love. Suddenly, he is startled to witness Rekha Shanta’s younger who charges for the betrayal. Meanwhile, Raja becomes a police officer who is assigned to snatch a mob to which Murali is also allied. 

Parallelly, Murali lusts on Seeta when Govindu revolts on him. So, he incriminates him and is apprehended by Raja. However, perceiving the actuality, he acquits him, and against the time, Murali molests Seeta. Here, Raja recognizes Seeta and pledges to straighten out the plight. In the interim, Shanta is cognizant of Raja & Rekha and adores her husband. Currently, Raja ceases the gang and reforms Murali when Garudachalam arraigns Raja for free-handing counterfeit currency. Accordingly, Shanta arrives and affirms the glory of Raja which Rekha too listens. Moreover, it is exposed that Garudachalam is a chieftain crime wing and is seized. At last, Shanta breathes her last on Raja’s lap.  Finally, the movie ends on a happy note with the marriage of Raja & Rekha.

Cast 

N. T. Rama Rao as Raja / Raja Shekaram
Vanisri as Rekha
B. Saroja Devi as Shanti
Krishnam Raju as Murali
Gummadi as Dr. Ranganatham
Relangi as Ramadasu
Dhulipala as Garudachalam
Raja Babu as Govindu
Ram Mohan as Chanti Babu
Sakshi Ranga Rao as Panganamalu
Mada as Panakaala Rao
Potti Prasad as Driver
K. K. Sarma
Anjali Devi  as Janaki
Vijaya Lalitha as Seetha
P. R. Varalakshmi as Sudha

Soundtrack 

Music composed by T. V. Raju and S. Hanumantha Rao.

References

External links 
 

1970s Telugu-language films
Films scored by T. V. Raju
Indian drama films
Telugu films remade in other languages